John C. Biggins (died September 18, 1971) was an American banker and the inventor of Charg-It, a forerunner of the bank credit card. He created Charg-It in 1946 while working for Flatbush National Bank in Brooklyn, New York.  At the time of his death, he was chairman of Franklin Bank of  Paterson, New Jersey. He had earlier been the bank's president. Notable positions he held include being a member of the board of trustees of St. Joseph's Hospital of Paterson, President of the Garden State Credit Bureau and Director of Group Health Insurance of New York and the Hamilton Club. He was married with 3 children and died in 1971.

References 

Year of birth missing
1971 deaths
Credit cards in the United States
American bankers